The Bradford Bypass, also known as the Highway 400–404 Link is a proposed east–west 400-series highway in the northern Greater Toronto Area of the Canadian province of Ontario. The approximately  route is currently undergoing planning and analysis under an environmental impact assessment (EA) by the Ministry of Transportation of Ontario (MTO) and the Government of Ontario. If approved, a new four-lane controlled-access highway would be built between Highway 400 near Bradford in Simcoe County, and Highway 404 near Queensville in York Region.  It would serve as a bypass to the north side of Bradford. 

The corridor originated in 1978 as an eastern extension of Highway 89 along Ravenshoe Road. This proposal was cancelled in 1986 and collaborative studies were undertaken between the province and affected municipalities over the next several years. A refined proposal for a freeway along a more southerly route, referred to as the Bradford Bypass, was released in 1989, after which an  began in 1993. The assessment was completed in 1997 and approved in 2002, after which it was announced that construction would begin by 2006 and be completed by 2010. However, following the 2003 Ontario general election, the Liberal government of Dalton McGuinty shelved several highway proposals — including the Bradford Bypass — to the "beyond 2031" timeframe. After the 2018 Ontario general election, the new Progressive Conservative (PC) government of Doug Ford announced that the  would be reviewed and updated. Funding was committed to the project in the 2021 budget, with early works construction scheduled to begin in early 2022. The highway is currently estimated to cost C$800 million.

The Bradford Bypass has been criticized for its potential environmental impacts, particularly to the Holland Marsh and surrounding wetlands draining into Lake Simcoe.

Route description 
The proposed route of the Bradford Bypass was established in the 1997 , including the location and design of interchanges.
If built, the approximately  corridor would consist of a four-lane rural freeway situated within a -wide right-of-way.

The proposed route of the Bradford Bypass would have it begin in the west at a freeway-to-freeway interchange with Highway400, midway between the 8th Line and 9th Line of Bradford West Gwillimbury. From there the four-lane rural highway would proceed east, crossing the 10th Sideroad and encountering an interchange with the northern section of Yonge Street (formerly Highway11 and presently Simcoe County Road 4) immediately north of the town of Bradford. It would then curve southeast to cross the West Holland River into the municipality of East Gwillimbury in York Region, after which it would encounter an interchange with Bathurst Street and straighten out towards the east.

The highway would cross the East Holland River and pass immediately south of the Silver Lakes Golf and Country Club. It would cross the southern section of Yonge Street (thus resulting in an unusual crossing of both offset legs of the street) then cut through farmland, parallel with Queensville Sideroad. At Leslie Street (York Regional Road 12), immediately north of the community of Queensville, a partial interchange would provide westbound access to and eastbound access from the highway. It would end shortly thereafter at a freeway-to-freeway interchange Highway404.

The Holland Marsh is a Provincially Significant Wetland,
portions of which are also designated as a Life Science Area of Natural and Scientific Interest (ANSI) and the remainder under the Natural Heritage System (NHS) of the Greenbelt.
The proposed route of the Bradford Bypass crosses the Holland Marsh between Yonge Street and Bathurst Street,
and would require  of land within the NHS portion; it will not cross any wetlands.
Bridges of approximately 400and 600metres (1300and 2000feet) will cross the two branches of the Holland River.

History

Highway 89 extension 
Proposals for a highway corridor south of Lake Simcoe date as far back as the 1960s, but were not formally considered until the late 1970s. On June30, 1978, a  extension of Highway89 east of Highway400 to Highway 12 was announced. It was to follow 11th Line from Highway400 east to the Holland Marsh, where it would cross towards the northeast onto the alignment of Ravenshoe Road (York Road32). The extension would have traversed the length of Ravenshoe Road to Lakeridge Road (Durham Road23), where it would zig-zag onto Concession Road7 and end immediately north of Sunderland.

In June 1981, environmental approval was given for the project, excluding the portion crossing of the Holland Marsh.
The marsh crossing was opposed by the Sierra Club,
the Federation of Ontario Naturalists,
the Canadian Wildlife Service,
and the Ministry of Natural Resources (MNR).
The , then known as the Ministry of Transportation and Communications (MTC), conducted several studies on the crossing and alternatives to it, which were collectively published in July 1984.
However, as a result of public opposition and due to the potential environmental impacts of crossing the marsh, Minister of Transportation Edward Fulton abruptly cancelled the project on April21, 1986. In his speech, Fulton said of the C$30million project: "The environmental impact outweighs the transportation benefits in the particular location."
While this was applauded by environmental advocates,
it was opposed by several local politicians, as well as the York Region Federation of Agriculture, both of which began to petition the government to reverse the decision.

Highway 400 – Highway 404 Link 
The  engaged in several years of consultations with York Region, Simcoe County, and various other project stakeholders. The resulting Highway404/89 Route Location Study, published in 1989, confirmed the need for a "Provincial facility north of Bradford linking Highway400 to the future Highway404 Extension."
Highway404 was itself opened as far north as Davis Drive (York Regional Road31) on October24, 1989; the proposed extension largely succeeded the Highway89 extension east of Woodbine Avenue.
Separate s for both the Bradford Bypass and the Highway404 extension began in 1993 and 1992, respectively.
The  for the Bradford Bypass was completed in December 1997, with environmental studies noting that the proposed highway may contaminate groundwater and the Lake Simcoe watershed. The Chippewas of Georgina Island First Nation were noted to oppose the route due to archaeological concerns.
Both s were approved on August28, 2002.
Later that year on October4, Minister of Transportation Norm Sterling announced that design work was progressing, with construction set to begin in 2006, with completion expected by 2010.

As an interim measure, several upgrades were made to the roads surrounding Newmarket in the early 2000s.
The Newmarket Bypass – consisting of the widening to four lanes of Davis Drive (former Highway9) between Highway400 and Bathurst Street, Bathurst Street between Davis Drive and Green Lane, and Green Lane between Bathurst Street and Leslie Street – was approved by York Region in January 1999; construction began in September 2002.
Construction began on a four-lane extension of Highway404 from Davis Drive to Green Lane, and the reconstruction of Green Lane into a four-laned arterial road between Leslie Street and Woodbine Avenue in September 2000.
The Newmarket Bypass was completed and opened on September1, 2004.

Meanwhile, during the 2003 Ontario general election campaign, incumbent PC premier Ernie Eves pledged to build the Bradford Bypass.
Liberal leader Dalton McGuinty, who would go on to win the election, promised to tackle gridlock with a transit-oriented approach, pledging only "the removal of highway bottlenecks."
The McGuinty government passed the Places to Grow Act in 2005, which set forth consistent urban planning principles across the province for the following 25years. The Growth Plan for the Greater Golden Horseshoe was released in June of the following year as a framework for implementing the act,
which despite including the Highway404 extension as far as Ravenshoe Road, did not show the Bradford Bypass.
Minister of Transportation Donna Cansfield confirmed in May 2007 that no further work was being undertaken on the corridor.

The Bradford Bypass was first included in the 2002 Transportation Master Plan for York Region. Simcoe County followed suit in its 2008 Transportation Master Plan.
In late 2011, York Region and Simcoe County commenced the York-Simcoe Boundary Area Transportation Needs Study as a basis to advocate for the bypass.

In 2014, a report into transportation needs in the Lake Simcoe area was positive about the highway, stating that the Bypass would be heavily used and easy to build. However, the report also stated that  alternatives such as building high-occupancy vehicle lanes on Highway 400 and improving local roads and interchanges could deliver similar benefits with less environmental impact.
Representatives from York Region, Simcoe County, East Gwillimbury, Georgina, Bradford West Gwillimbury, Innisfil, Essa Township and Newmarket together lobbied the provincial government in November 2015 to put the project on its growth plan.
The bypass was revived on May18, 2017 when it was included in the five-year Growth Plan for the Greater Golden Horseshoe, though without a timeline for construction.

Current status 

The  is currently in the process of updating the 1997 , with completion expected in 2023.
Engineering and design work on the bypass began in the summer of 2020,
while environmental studies to update the 1997  commenced in September.
The 2021 Ontario Budget, released on March24, 2021, allocated funding towards the highway.
Early works construction was tentatively scheduled to begin in the autumn of 2021, but was deferred until early 2022.
As of June 2021, the project's estimated cost is C$800 million.

following a formal request from Environmental Defence.
On May3, 2021, Wilkinson announced that a federal  would not take place for the Bradford Bypass, while the GTA West project would undergo this process. In February 2022, the federal government reiterated that the project would not undergo a federal , despite requests from environmental groups.

In April and May 2021, a virtual public consultation regarding design alternatives for refinements to the route identified in the 2002  took place.
Proposed changes included realigning the Holland River crossing to the south to reduce the impact on the river,
new designs for interchanges to meet contemporary  standards,
and other minor realignments and changes.
Following analysis of this consultation, a subsequent public consultation in the autumn of 2022 will present the preferred design for the route.

In October 2021, a Toronto Star investigation into the Bypass found that the proposed modification to the route would remove it from a golf course jointly owned by the father of MPP Stan Cho, associate minister of transportation.
Cho responded that the conflict of interest had been declared, and that he did not take part in any work connected to the Bypass. In February 2022, the Integrity Commissioner of Ontario found there was no evidence of wrongdoing by Minister Mulroney or Associate Minister Cho regarding the rerouting of the Bypass.

A Freedom of information request demonstrated that the province had undertaken a business case on the potential of the Bypass being a toll road similar to Highway 407, to potentially reduce the cost of building the highway.
However, the office of Minister Mulroney stated that "it is not our intention to toll this highway".
Funding was committed to the project as part of the fall economic statement on November1, 2021.

Perspectives 
Construction of the highway is supported by the provincial government, the upper-tier governments of York Region and Simcoe County,
and the local municipalities of Bradford West Gwillimbury, East Gwillimbury, Georgina, Innisfil, King and Newmarket.
It is also supported by the Holland Marsh Growers Association and local businesses.
, Liberal and  candidates for the riding of York—Simcoe all publicly supported the highway during the 2018 provincial election campaign,
with Liberal leader Steven Del Duca stating in 2021 that support from locals means that the highway proposal is worth consideration.
A 2016 survey commissioned by the Town of Bradford West Gwillimbury showed that 85% of residents support construction of the Bradford Bypass, with stronger support among those familiar with the proposal.
Claimed benefits of the bypass would include removing through traffic from nearby rural roads and urban areas,
reduced congestion, improved air quality, and the potential revitalisation of downtown Bradford.

Environmental groups including Environmental Defence Canada, the Rescue Lake Simcoe Coalition and Simcoe County Greenbelt Coalition oppose the highway, criticising the impact it would have on the environment. In addition to increasing air pollution and greenhouse gas emissions, opponents claim the highway would disrupt woodlands, provincially significant wetlands, the Lake Simcoe watershed, wildlife habitats and species at risk.
The highway has also historically been criticised for its potential impact on the Holland Marsh and the Holland River.
According to the 1997 , it would cause severe water quality impacts in the Lake Simcoe watershed, with further studies required if the project was proceeded with.
They have also criticised the 32year timeframe since the need for and alternatives to the project were last assessed, the changes in circumstances since then, the potential for urban sprawl along the highway, and a claim that the bypass would save drivers only "60 to 80seconds" of journey time.

Archaeologists, historians, and Indigenous groups are also concerned about the threat the bypass would pose to the Lower Landing, a nationally significant historic site thought to be located along the proposed route. The Lower Landing was a key meeting place on the route connecting Lake Ontario to Lake Huron, and had been used for centuries by Indigenous peoples, explorers, fur traders, settlers, and soldiers travelling between the lower and upper Great Lakes prior to the mid-1800s.
Indigenous groups and heritage advocates are concerned that construction of the proposed bypass would irreversibly destroy the site before it can be properly investigated.  

Local municipalities and the provincial government have pushed back on environmental concerns, noting that the  will be updated to take into account existing and new federal & provincial legislation and standards.
The , meanwhile, contends that the route would result in "10 to 35 minutes of travel time saved each way."

Exit list 
The following table lists the proposed locations for interchanges along the Bradford Bypass contained within the MTO review.

Notes

References

External links 

 Official project website
 Government of Ontario page on the Highway 400 – Highway 404 Extension Link (Bradford Bypass)
 Information about the proposal from the Town of East Gwillimbury

Roads in Simcoe County
Roads in the Regional Municipality of York
Proposed roads in Canada